The Liaodi Pagoda of Kaiyuan Monastery, Dingzhou, Hebei Province, China is the tallest existing pre-modern Chinese pagoda and tallest brick pagoda in the world, built in the 11th century during the Song dynasty (960–1279). Upon completion in 1055, the Liaodi Pagoda surpassed the height of China's previously tallest pagoda still standing, the central pagoda of the Three Pagodas, which stands at 69.13 m (230 ft). The tallest pagoda in pre-modern Chinese history was a -tall wooden pagoda tower in Chang'an built in 611 by Emperor Yang of Sui, yet this structure no longer stands. It is considered one of the Four Treasures of Hebei.

History
Construction on this stone and brick pagoda began in the year 1001 AD during the reign of Emperor Zhenzong of Song, and was completed in 1055 AD during the reign of Emperor Renzong of Song. Emperor Zhenzong intended to have Buddhist scriptures gathered by the Chinese monk Huineng from India stored at the pagoda's site.  Due to its location at a strategic military location, the height of the pagoda made it useful as a watchtower, which could be used to spot enemy movements coming from the northern Liao dynasty headed by the Song's Khitan rivals. Initially the pagoda was called the Kaiyuan Pagoda, but as a result of its military use it became known as the 'Liaodi' pagoda, literally meaning 'foreseeing the enemy's intentions.'

Another pagoda of similar height and design is the Chongwen Pagoda of Shaanxi Province. Completed in 1605 during the Ming dynasty, the Chongwen Pagoda stands at a height of 79 m (259 ft), making it the second tallest pagoda built in pre-modern China.

Features
Each floor of the Liaodi Pagoda features gradually-tiered stone eaves, doors and windows (with false windows on four sides of the octagonal structure) while the first floor has an encircling balcony. A split section of the pagoda's walls are open so that the tower's interior may be viewed, along with the actual thickness of the walls. At the top of its steeple, the pagoda  features a crowning spire made of bronze and iron. In the interior a large staircase with landings for each floor winds from the bottom all the way up to the top floor. Brick brackets are used to support the landings on each floor, while from the eighth story up there are no brackets supporting the vaulted ceiling. Within the pagoda is a large pillar in the shape of another pagoda, as seen from the inside and as viewed from the cut section. The painted murals and stone steles with Chinese calligraphy in the pagoda are dated to the Song period when the pagoda was built.

See also
Chinese architecture
Architecture of the Song dynasty
History of architecture
List of tallest structures built before the 20th century
Porcelain Tower of Nanjing, a now destroyed pagoda that was 260 ft tall
Tianning Temple (Changzhou), contains China's largest pagoda, albeit modern (completed in 2007)

Notes

References
Benn, Charles (2002). China's Golden Age: Everyday Life in the Tang Dynasty. Oxford: Oxford University Press. .
Cai, Yanxin (2011) [2010]. Chinese Architecture. Cambridge & New York: Cambridge University Press (first published by China Intercontinental Press). .
Steinhardt, Nancy Shatzman (1997). Liao Architecture. Honolulu: University of Hawaii Press.
Xu Xiaoying, ed. Zhongguo Guta Zaoxing. Beijing: Chinese Forest Press, 2007.

External links
Liaodi Pagoda at Kaiyuan Temple
Chinese Pagodas, including Liaodi
Liaodi Pagoda at China.org.cn
Close-up detail of the upper half of the pagoda

Buddhist temples in Hebei
Pagodas in China
Octagonal buildings in China
Song dynasty architecture
11th-century Buddhist temples
11th-century establishments in China
Major National Historical and Cultural Sites in Hebei
Dingzhou